Mesacanthion is a genus of nematodes belonging to the family Thoracostomopsidae.

The genus has almost cosmopolitan distribution.

Species:

Mesacanthion africanthiforme 
Mesacanthion africanum 
Mesacanthion agubernatus 
Mesacanthion alexandrinus 
Mesacanthion arabium 
Mesacanthion arcuatile 
Mesacanthion armatum 
Mesacanthion audax 
Mesacanthion banale 
Mesacanthion brachycolle 
Mesacanthion breviseta 
Mesacanthion cavei 
Mesacanthion ceeum 
Mesacanthion conicum 
Mesacanthion cricetoides 
Mesacanthion diplechma 
Mesacanthion ditlevseni 
Mesacanthion donsitarvae 
Mesacanthion fricum 
Mesacanthion gracilisetosum 
Mesacanthion hawaiiense 
Mesacanthion heterospiculum 
Mesacanthion hirsutum 
Mesacanthion infantile 
Mesacanthion jejuensis 
Mesacanthion karense 
Mesacanthion kerguelense 
Mesacanthion longispiculum 
Mesacanthion longissimesetosum 
Mesacanthion lucifer 
Mesacanthion majus 
Mesacanthion marisalbi 
Mesacanthion monhystera 
Mesacanthion obscurum 
Mesacanthion pacificum 
Mesacanthion pali 
Mesacanthion pannosum 
Mesacanthion paradentatum 
Mesacanthion primitivum 
Mesacanthion propinquum 
Mesacanthion proximum 
Mesacanthion rigens 
Mesacanthion southerni 
Mesacanthion studiosum 
Mesacanthion tenuicaudatum 
Mesacanthion ungulatum 
Mesacanthion virile

References

Nematodes